Pandemis isotetras is a species of moth of the  family Tortricidae. It is found in Equatorial Guinea (Bioko).

References

	

Moths described in 1934
Pandemis